Walter H. Trumbull, Jr. (July 16, 1893 – December 1976) was an American football player. He attended Middlesex School in Concord, Massachusetts before enrolling at Harvard College.  He played at the tackle and center positions for Percy Haughton's Harvard Crimson football from 1912 to 1914.  During Trumbull's three years as a starter for Harvard, the football team did not lose a single game compiling records of 9–0 in 1912, 9–0 in 1913, and 7–0–2 in 1914.  In December 1913, he placed second to Charles Brickley in voting among his teammates for the position of captain of the 1914 team.  Trumbull was selected as a first-team All-American at the tackle position in 1914.  During World War I, Trumbull was placed in charge of motion picture work for the Army and Navy YMCA in France.  He later served as the president of the Harvard Club and national vice-chairman of Harvard Divinity School's endowment fund drive.

References

Year of birth uncertain
1893 births
1976 deaths
Harvard Crimson football players
All-American college football players
American football tackles
Sportspeople from Salem, Massachusetts
Players of American football from Massachusetts
Middlesex School alumni
Harvard College alumni